The following is a list of Japanese battles, organised by date.

Ancient/Classical Japan

Jōmon Period 
Jimmu's Eastern Expedition (c. 7th century BCE)

Yayoi Period 
Takehaniyasuhiko Rebellion (c. 1st century BCE) :ja:武埴安彦命
Expedition of Yamato Takeru (c. late 1st century-early 2nd century) :ja:ヤマトタケル
 Civil war of Wa (146–189 or 178–184)

Kofun period 

Expedition of Empress Jingū (c. 3rd century) :ja:三韓征伐
Goguryeo–Yamato War (391–404)
Kibi Clan Rebellion (463)
 Prince Hoshikawa Rebellion (479)
 Iwai Rebellion (527–528)
 Musashi no Kuni no Miyatsuko Rebellion (534) :ja:武蔵国造の乱

Asuka period 

 Battle of Shigisan (587)
 Isshi Incident (645)　
 North expedition of Abe no Hirafu (658–660) :ja:阿倍比羅夫
 Battle of Baekgang (663) 
 Jinshin War (672)

Nara Period 
 Hayato Rebellion (720–721)
 Fujiwara no Hirotsugu Rebellion (740)
 Fujiwara no Nakamaro Rebellion (764)
 Thirty-Eight Year War (774–811) 
 Hōki Rebellion (780–781?) :ja:宝亀の乱
 Battle of Subuse (788) :ja:巣伏の戦い

Heian Period 
 Thirty-Eight Year War (774–811) 
 Conquest by Sakanoue no Tamuramaro (801)
 Last Conquest by Funya no Watamaro (811)
Gangyō Rebellion (878) :ja:元慶の乱
Kanbyō Silla pirate invasion (893) :ja:新羅の入寇
Jōhei-Tengyō Rebellion (936–941) :ja:承平天慶の乱
Fujiwara no Koresuke Rebellion (947) :ja:藤原是助の乱
Toi invasion (1019)
Taira no Tadatsune Rebellion (1028–1030) :ja:平忠常の乱
 Zenkunen War (1051–1062) 
 Battle of Onikiribe (1051)
 Battle of Kinomi (1057)
 Siege of Komatsu (1062)
 Siege of Koromogawa (1062)
 Siege of Kuriyagawa　(1062) 
 Enkyū Battle of Ezo (1070) :ja:延久蝦夷合戦
 Gosannen War (1083–1087) 
 Siege of Kanezawa (1087)
Minamoto no Yoshichika Rebellion (1107–1108) :ja:源義親の乱
 Hōgen Rebellion (1156) 
 Heiji Rebellion (1159)

Genpei War (1179–1185)

 Battle of Ishibashiyama (1180)　
 Battle of Fujigawa (1180) 
 Battle of Sunomata-gawa (1181) 
 Battle of Kurikara (1183) 
 Siege of Hōjūjidono (1184)　
 Battle of Uji (1184) 
 Battle of Awazu (1184) 
 Battle of Ichi-no-Tani (1184) 
 Battle of Kojima (1184) 
 Battle of Yashima (1185) 
 Battle of Dan-no-ura (1185)

Feudal Japan

Kamakura period 
 Battle of Ōshū (1189)
 Kennin Rebellion (1201)
 Hatakeyama Shigetada Rebellion(1205)ja:畠山忠重の乱
 Wada Rebellion (1213) :ja:和田合戦
 Miura Rebellion (1247) :ja:宝治合戦 
 Jōkyū War (1221) 
 Battle of Uji (1221)

Mongol Invasions of Japan (1274 & 1281)
February Incident(1272) :ja:二月騒動
Battle of Bun'ei (1274)　
Battle of Kōan (1281)

Genkō War (1331–1333)

 Siege of Kasagi(1331) 
 Siege of Akasaka (1331) 
 Siege of Chihaya (1333) 
 Battle of Bubaigawara (1333)　
 Siege of Kamakura (1333)

Muromachi period 
 Nakasendai Rebellion (1335) :ja:中先代の乱

Nanboku-chō period (1336–1392)
 Battle of Tatarahama (1336) 
 Battle of Minatogawa (1336) 
 Siege of Kanegasaki (1337) 
 Battle of Ishizu (1338) :ja:石津の戦い
 Battle of Shijō Nawate (1348) 
 Kannō Incident (1350–1352) :ja:観応の擾乱
 Battle of Uchidehama (1351) :ja:打出浜の戦い
 Battle of Chikugogawa (1359) :ja:筑後川の戦い
 Ōei Rebellion (1399) :ja:応永の乱
 Rebellion of Uesugi Zenshū (1416–1417) :ja:上杉禅秀の乱
 Eikyō Rebellion (1438–1439) :ja:永享の乱
 Siege of Yūki (1440) :ja:結城合戦
 Kakitsu Incident (1441) :ja:嘉吉の乱
 Koshamain's Revolt (1456–1457) :ja:コシャマインの戦い

Kyōtoku Incident (1455–1482)
 Battle of Bubaigawara (1455) :ja:分倍河原の戦い(室町時代)
 Battle of Irako (1459–1477) :ja:五十子の戦い
 Nagao Kageharu Rebellion (1476–1480) :ja:長尾景春の乱
 Battle of Egota-Numabukurohara (1477) :ja:江古田・沼袋原の戦い

Ōnin War (1467–1477)

 Battle of Goryō (1467) :ja:御霊合戦
 Battle of Higashi Iwakura (1467) :ja:東岩倉の戦い
 Battle of Shokokuji  (1467) :ja:相国寺の戦い
 Battle of Kamigyo (1467) :ja:上京の戦い
 Battle of Ichijo Omiya (1467)

Sengoku period 
 Chōkyō Incident (1487–1505)　:ja:長享の乱
 Battle of Tachigawara (1504) :ja:立河原の戦い
 Battle of Kuzuryūgawa (1506)
 Battle of Nyoigatake (1509) :ja:如意ケ嶽の戦い
 Battle of Nagamorihara (1510) :ja:長森原の戦い
 Siege of Gongenyama (1510)
 Siege of Arai (1516) 
 Battle of Arita-Nakaide (1517) :ja:有田中井手の戦い
 Battle of Iidagawara (1521)
 Ningbo Turmoil (1523) :ja:寧波の乱
 Siege of Edo (1524)
 Siege of Kamakura (1526)
 Battle of Nashinokidaira (1526)
 Battle of Katsuragawa (1527) :ja:桂川原の戦い
 Battle of Ozawahara (1530)
 Battle of Tatenawate (1530) :ja:田手畷の戦い
 Battle of Shiokawa no gawara (1531)
 Kyoroku War (1531) :ja:享禄の錯乱
 Battle of Daimotsu (1531) :ja:大物崩れ
 Tenbun War (1532–1535) :ja:天文の錯乱
 Siege of Iimoriyama (1532) ja:飯盛山城の戦い
 Siege of Sakai (1532)
 Siege of Yamashina Honganji (1532) ja:山科本願寺の戦い
 Battle of Idano (1535)
 Battle of Un no Kuchi (1536)　
 Battle of Sanbuichigahara (1536)
 Hanakura Incident (1536) :ja:花倉の乱
 Battle of Sendanno (1536)
 Siege of Musashi-Matsuyama (1537)　
 Battle of Kōnodai (1538) 
 Battle of Ichirai (1539)
 Siege of Koriyama (1540-1541) 
 Battle of Sezawa (1542)
 Siege of Uehara (1542)
 Siege of Kuwabara (1542)
 Siege of Fukuyo (1542)
 Battle of Ankokuji (1542)
 First Battle of Azukizaka (1542) 
 Siege of Toda Castle (1542–1543) 
 Utsuro Rebellion (1542–1548) :ja:天文の乱(洞の乱)
 Siege of Tochio (1544)
 Siege of Takatō (1545)
 Battle of Kawagoe (1546) 
 Battle of Odaihara (1546) 
 Siege of Shika Castle (1546-1547)
 Battle of Kanōguchi (1547)
 Second Battle of Azukizaka (1548)
 Battle of Uedahara (1548) 
 Battle of Shiojiritoge (1548)
 Siege of Kajiki (1549)
 Siege of Toishi (1550) :ja:砥石崩れ
 Tainei-ji incident (1551)
 Battle of Kiyosu Castle (1552)
 Siege of Katsurao (1553)
 First Battle of Kawanakajima (1553)
 Siege of Kannomine (1554)
 Siege of Matsuo (1554)
 Battle of Enshu-Omori (1554)
 Siege of Iwatsurugi Castle (1554)
 Battle of Muraki Castle (1554)
 Second Battle of Kawanakajima (1555)
 Battle of Ino (1555)
 Battle of Miyajima (1555)
 Battle of Nagaragawa (1556)
 Siege of Katsurayama (1557)
 Third Battle of Kawanakajima (1557)
 Battle of Ukino (1558)
 Siege of Terabe (1558)
 Siege of Marune (1560)
 Battle of Okehazama (1560)
 Battle of Tonomoto (1560)
 Battle of Norada (1560)
 Battle of Moribe (1561)
 First Siege of Odawara (1561)
 Fourth Battle of Kawanakajima (1561)
 Siege of Moji (1561)
 Battle of Kyōkōji (1562)
 Siege of Kaminogō Castle (1562)
 Siege of Musashi-Matsuyama (1563)
 Battle of Batogahara (1564)
 Battle of Kōnodai (1564)
 Fifth Battle of Kawanakajima (1564)
 Battle of Fukuda Bay (1565)
 Siege of Minowa (1566)
 Siege of Inabayama Castle (1567)

Azuchi–Momoyama period
 Battle of Torisaka (1568)
 Siege of Hachigata (1568)
 Siege of Tachibana (1569)
 Battle of Tatarahama (1569)
 Second Siege of Odawara (1569)
 Battle of Mimasetoge (1569)
 Siege of Kakegawa (1569)
 Siege of Kanbara (1569)
 Battle of Nunobeyama (1570)
 Battle of Takehiro (1571)
 Siege of Fukazawa (1571)
 Battle of Tonegawa (1571)
 Siege of Futamata (1572)
 Battle of Kizaki (1572)
 Siege of Noda Castle (1573)
 First Siege of Takatenjin (1574)
 Siege of Yoshida Castle (1575)
 Siege of Takabaru (1576)
 Siege of Nanao (1577)
 Siege of Otate (1578)
 Battle of Mimigawa (1578)
 Battle of Mimaomote (1579)
 Battle of Omosu (1580)
 Battle of Nakatomigawa (1582)
 Battle of Okitanawate (1584)
 Siege of Iwaya Castle (1586)
 Battle of Hitotoribashi (1586)
 Battle of Koriyama (1588)
 Siege of Kurokawa Castle (1589)
 Battle of Suriagehara (1589)

Unification by Oda Nobunaga 
 Siege of Kanegasaki (1570)
 Siege of Chōkō-ji (1570)
 Battle of Anegawa (1570)
 Ishiyama Hongan-ji War (1570–1580)
 Siege of Mount Hiei (1571)
 Sieges of Nagashima (1571, 1573, 1574)
 Siege of Iwamura Castle (1572)
 Battle of Mikatagahara (1573)
 Siege of Odani Castle (1573)
 Siege of Ichijōdani Castle (1573)
 Battle of Nagashino (1575)
 Battles of Kizugawaguchi (1576, 1578)
 Siege of Kuroi Castle (1577)
 Siege of Shigisan (1577)
 Battle of Tedorigawa (1577)
 Siege of Kōzuki Castle (1578)
 Siege of Miki (1578–1580)
 Siege of Yakami (1579)
 Siege of Itami (1579)
 Tenshō Iga War (1579, 1581)
 Siege of Hijiyama (1581)
 Second Siege of Takatenjin (1581)
 Siege of Tottori (1581)
 Battle of Tenmokuzan (1582)
 Siege of Takatō (1582)
 Siege of Takamatsu (1582)
 Siege of Uozu (1582)
 Honnō-ji Incident (1582)
 Battle of Kanagawa (1582)

Unification by Toyotomi Hideyoshi 
 Battle of Yamazaki (1582)
 Battle of Shizugatake (1583)
 Battle of Hiketa (1583)
 Battle of Komaki and Nagakute (1584)
 Siege of Kanie (1584)
 Siege of Suemori (1584)
 Siege of Negoro-ji (1585)
 Siege of Ōta Castle (1585)
 Siege of Toyama (1585)
 Shikoku campaign (1585)
 Kyūshū campaign (1586–1587)
 Siege of Shimoda (1590)
 Siege of Hachigata (1590)
 Siege of Odawara (1590)
 Siege of Oshi (1590)
 Kunohe Rebellion (1591)
 Hideyoshi's invasions of Korea (1592–1598)
 Battle of Bunroku (1592–1593)
 Battle of Keicho (1597–1598)

Unification by Tokugawa Ieyasu 
 Siege of Shiroishi (1600)
 Siege of Hataya (1600)
 Siege of Kaminoyama (1600)
 Siege of Hasedō (1600)
 Siege of Matsukawa (1600)
 Siege of Tanabe (1600)
 Battle of Gifu Castle (1600)
 Siege of Fushimi (1600)
 Battle of Asai (1600)
 Siege of Annotsu (1600)
 Siege of Ueda (1600)
 Siege of Ōtsu (1600)
 Battle of Ishigakibara (1600)
 Battle of Kuisegawa (1600)
 Battle of Sekigahara (1600)
 Siege of Udo (1600)
 Siege of Yanagawa (1600)
 Siege of Sawayama (1600)

Edo period 
Battle of Matsukawa (1601)
Invasion of Ryukyu (1609)
Nossa Senhora da Graça incident (1610)
Siege of Osaka (1614–1615)
Winter Campaign (大坂冬の陣 Osaka Fuyu no Jin)
Battle of Imafuku (1614)
Battle of Shigino (1614)
Battle of Kizugawa (1614)
Battle of Noda-Fukushima (1614)
Siege of Sanada-maru (1615)
Summer Campaign (大坂夏の陣 Osaka Natsu no Jin)
Battle of Kashii (1615)
Battle of Dōmyōji (1615)
Battle of Yao (1615)
Battle of Wakae (1615)
Battle of Tennoji (1615)
Shimabara Rebellion (1637–1638)
Shakushain's Revolt (1669–1672)
Jōkyō Uprising (1686)
Ueda Rebellion (1761) :ja:上田騒動
Nijinomatsubara Rebellion (1771) :ja:虹の松原一揆
Menashi-Kunashir Rebellion (1789)
Ōshio Heihachirō's Rebellion (1837)
Tsushima Incident (1862)
Battle of Shimonoseki Straits (1863)
Battles for Shimonoseki (1863)
Bombardment of Kagoshima (1863)
Mito Rebellion (1864)
Kinmon Incident (1864)
First Chōshū expedition (1864)
Battles for Shimonoseki (1864)
Second Chōshū expedition (1866)

Boshin War (1868–1869)

Battle of Toba–Fushimi (1868)
Battle of Awa (1868)
Battle of Kōshū-Katsunuma (1868)
Battle of Utsunomiya Castle (1868)
Battle of Ueno (1868)
Battle of Aizu (1868)
Battle of Miyako Bay (1869)
Battle of Hakodate (1869)
Naval Battle of Hakodate (1869)

Modern Period

Meiji period 
Saga Rebellion (1874)
Japanese invasion of Taiwan (1874)
Ganghwa Island incident (1875)
Shinpūren Rebellion (1876)
Akizuki Rebellion (1876)
Hagi Rebellion (1876)
Satsuma Rebellion (1877)
Siege of Kumamoto Castle (1877)
Battle of Tabaruzaka (1877)
Battle of Shiroyama (1877)
Donghak Peasant Revolution (1894–1895)
Battle of Ugeumchi (1894)

First Sino-Japanese War (1894–1895)
Battle of Pungdo (1894)
Battle of Seonghwan (1894)
Battle of Pyongyang (1894)
Battle of Yalu River (1894)
Battle of Jiuliancheng (1894)
Battle of Lushunkou (1894)
Battle of Weihaiwei (1895)
Battle of Yingkou (1895)
Japanese invasion of Taiwan (1895)
Pescadores Campaign (1895)
Battle of Keelung (1895) (1895)
Hsinchu Campaign (1895)
Battle of Baguashan (1895)
Battle of Chiayi (1895)
Battle of Chiatung (1895)
Capitulation of Tainan (1895)
Battle of Changhsing (1895)

Boxer Rebellion (1899–1901)

Russo-Japanese War (1904–1905)
 Battle of Port Arthur (1904–1905)
 Battle of Yalu River (1904)
 Battle of the Yellow Sea (1904)
 Battle of Nanshan (1904)
 Battle of Shantung (1904)
 Battle of Dairen (1904)
 Battle of Liaoyang (1904)
 Battle of Tsushima (1905)
 Battle of Mukden (1905)

Japan–Korea Treaty of 1907 (1907)
 Namdaemun Battle (1907)

Invasion of Manchuria(1931)

Taisho Period

World War I (1914–1918)
 Siege of Tsingtao (1914)

Siberian Intervention (1918–1922)

 Battle of Qingshanli (1920)
 Battle of Fengwudong (1920)

Invasion of Manchuria (1931)

Showa Period

Second Sino-Japanese War (1937–1945)
 Marco Polo Bridge Incident (1937)
 Battle of Beiping–Tianjin (July–August 1937)
 Battle of Shanghai (1937)
 Battle of Pingxingguan (1937)
 Battle of Nanjing (1937)
 Battle of Taiyuan (1937)
 Battle of Xuzhou (1937)
 Battle of Taierzhuang (1938)
 Battle of Wuhan (1938)
 Battle of Canton (October–December 1938)
 Hainan Island Operation (February 1939) 
 Battles of Khalkhin Gol (Nomonhan Incident) (1939)
 Battle of Changsha (1939)
 Hundred Regiments Offensive (1940)

Invasion of French Indochina (1940)

World War II
1941
 Attack on Pearl Harbor 
 Japanese invasion of The Philippines 
 Japanese invasion of Thailand
 Battle of Malaya 
 Battle of Hong Kong
 Battle of Guam
 Battle of Wake Island
 Battle of Singapore 
 Battle of Borneo
 Battle of Kampar
1942
 Battle of Bataan
 Battle of Manado
 Battle of Tarakan
 Battle of Balikpapan
 Battle of Ambon
 Marshalls-Gilberts raids
 Battle of Makassar Strait
 Invasion of Sumatra
 Battle of Palembang
 Battle of Badung Strait
 Battle of Timor
 Battle of the Java Sea
 Battle of the Coral Sea 
 Battle of Corregidor
 Battle of Midway
 Battle of the Eastern Solomons
 Battle of Savo Island 
 Battle of Milne Bay 
 Battle of Tassafaronga 
 Battle of the Santa Cruz Islands 
 Battle of Guadalcanal (7 August 1942 – 9 February 1943)
1943
 Battle of the Bismarck Sea (2–4 March)
 Battle of the Komandorski Islands (27 March)
 Battle of Bairoko (20 July)
 Battle of Empress Augusta Bay (1–2 November)
 Battle of Tarawa (20 November – 23 November)
1944
 Battle of Imphal (March – July)
 Battle of the Philippine Sea (19–20 June)
 Battle of Saipan (15 June – 9 July)
 Battle of Guam (21 July — 10 August)
 Battle of Peleliu (September – November)
 Battle of Leyte Gulf (23–26 October)
 Battle of Leyte (17 October – 31 December)
1945
 Battle of Iwo Jima (19 February – 26 March)
 Battle of Okinawa (April – June)
 Operation Ten-Go (April)
 Soviet invasion of Manchuria (9 August – 2 September)

Heisei Period 
 Battle of Amami-Ōshima (2001)

See also
 Military history of Japan
 Battles of the Imperial Japanese Navy

 
Battles
Battles